Psychrobacter faecalis is a bioaerosol  which is a collection of airborne biological material which can spread bacterium that was initially found from people contaminated by pigeon feces in Germany. This bacterium is a gram negative, and oxidase negative which is classified from the Psychrobacter genus. Most of this genus are found in areas of marine and terrestrial types as well as foods, soil, air, seawater, sea ice. This genus was created in 1986, where Psy. immobilis was the only species in it at the time but now holding 26 (Psy. adeliensis; Psy. alimentarius; Psy. aquaticus; Psy. aquimaris; Psy. arenosus; Psy. celer; Psy. cibarius; Psy. faecalis; Psy. fozi; Psy. frigidicola; Psy. glacincola; Psy. immobilis; Psy. jeotgali; Psy. luti; Psy. marincola; Psy. maritimus; Psy. namhaensis; Psy. nivimaris; Psy. okhotskensis; Psy. pacificensis; Psy. phenylpyruvicus; Psy. proteolyticus; Psy. pulmonis; Psy. salsus; Psy. urativorans; Psy. vallis).

Type and morphology 
A Single-cell, gram-negative with straight rods at 0.8- 1.2 x 1.0- 2.0 micrometers in size from a microscope. It has a chemoheterotrophic metabolism as well as a polar lipid profile and circular and opaque colonies. It grows in 4 to 36 degrees Celsius with complex media and 45 to 55 degrees Celsius on nutrient agar.

Virulence 
99.66% identity with P. faecalis ISO-46T when analyzing the complete 16S rRNA gene sequence of strain M9- 54- 1. These genomes are also deposited in the NCBI genome database under accession number JADGFW000000000. The whole-genome sequence of this strain and found that the entire 16S rRNA sequence shares 99.78–99.66% identity with Psychrobacter pulmonis CECT 5989T, and P. faecalis ISO-46T.. When analyzing the 16 s rRNA, researchers found that this supported that the genus Psychrobacter had allocation, and all species listed, had similar genus’ lower than 97%.

Diagnosis and treatment 
Psychrobacter faecalis is a new bacterium that is studied, and there is yet a way to prevent and treat one who is infected. There have been tests run to analyze and break down the bacterium, still nothing is confirmed as we have yet to see how this bacterium responds over time or even to changes in its environment. There may be some similarities to its similar family members of psychrobacter but being this species, it shows it isn’t quite the same. With more of these tests, we can then know how it infects hosts to then also understand how we can weaken it as well.

Prevention 
As we don’t know much about the spread of this species, all we can do is focus on the roots of what we do know of it. The most significant form of prevention we can follow is to avoid contact with pigeon feces, as we understand that this is where those infected have made contact. We would also like to ask those to continue to wash hands when coming back from outside to strengthen one’s odds of avoiding contamination from items that may have had any contact with pigeon feces. As we reduce the territory of infection, we not only keep ourselves clean but also learn of other means of infection this bacterium may find to infect hosts.

References 

Deschaght P, Jenssens M, Vaneechoutte M, Wauters G (2012) Psychrobacter isolates of human origin, other than Psychrobacter phenylpyruvicus, are predominantly Psychrobacter faecalis and Psychrobacter pulmonis, with embedded description of P. faecalis. International Journal of Systemic and Evolutionary Microbiology 62: 671-674

Gori K, Ryssel M, Arneborg N, Jespersen L (2012) Isolation and identification of the microbiota of Danish farmhouse and industrially produced surface-ripened cheeses. Microbial Ecology 65: 602-615

Kampfer P, Albrecht A, Buczolits S, Busse HJ (2002) Psychrobacter faecalis sp. nov., a new species from a bioaerosol originating from pigeon faeces. Systematic and Applied and Technology 25: 31-36

Reina J C, Manuel R, Salto R, Camara M, Llamas I (2021) AhaP, A quorum quenching acylase from Psychrobacter sp. M9-54-1 that attenuates Pseudomonas aeruginosa and Vibrio coralliilyticus virulence. Marine Drugs. 19

Thanh P N, Hong V D, Ngoc D C, The V B (2021) Cellulose degrading ability of bacterial strains isolated from gut of termites in Vinhlong province- Vietnam. Chemical Engineering Transactions. Volume 88

Moraxellaceae
Bacteria described in 1986